"My Cousin in Milwaukee" is a song composed by George Gershwin with lyrics by Ira Gershwin.  It was introduced in their 1932 musical Pardon My English. the song, indeed the show, was not a particular hit, although there's a number of vintage recordings of the tune.

Among them;
 Victor Arden-Phil Ohman & their Orchestra (Victor 24206)
 Lyda Roberti+ with Eddy Duchin and his Central Park Casino Orchestra (Brunswick unissued)
(+ There has been an ongoing debate about the vocalist by collectors.  Many people believe the singer is Gertrude Neisen, who was known for her accurate impersonation of Roberti.)

Notable recordings
Ella Fitzgerald - Ella Fitzgerald Sings the George and Ira Gershwin Songbook (1959)
Arnetia Walker, complete score recoding of "Pardon My English", 1994 Roxbury/Electra/Nonesuch

Songs with music by George Gershwin
Songs with lyrics by Ira Gershwin
Songs from musicals
1932 songs
Songs about Wisconsin